Euler is a lunar impact crater located in the southern half of the Mare Imbrium, and is named after the Swiss mathematician, physician and astronomer Leonhard Euler. The most notable nearby feature is Mons Vinogradov to the west-southwest. There is a cluster of low ridges to the southwest, and this formation includes the small crater Natasha and the tiny Jehan. About 200 kilometers to the east-northeast is the comparably sized crater Lambert.

Euler's rim is surrounded by a low rampart, and contain some slight terracing and slumped features on the irregular inner wall surface. In the middle of the small interior floor is a low central peak that formed from the rebound subsequent to the impact. The crater has a minor system of rays that extend for a distance of 200 kilometers.

Satellite craters
By convention these features are identified on lunar maps by placing the letter on the side of the crater midpoint that is closest to Euler.

The following craters have been renamed by the IAU.

 Euler K — See Jehan.
 Euler P — See Natasha.

References

External links

Layering in Euler Crater - Lunar Reconnaissance Orbiter page with photos

Impact craters on the Moon